This is a list of rivers within or originating in, or in one case transiting, the Canadian Rockies.

Hudson Bay and Pacific Ocean drainage
Divide Creek

Hudson Bay (Atlantic Ocean) drainage
North Saskatchewan River
South Saskatchewan River
Bow River
Elbow River
Oldman River
Crowsnest River
Red Deer River

Pacific Ocean drainage
Columbia River
Flathead River
Kootenay River
Elk River
Fording River
Vermilion River
Simpson River
Kicking Horse River
Amiskwi River
Yoho River
Little Yoho River
Fraser River
Torpy River
Swiftcurrent Creek
Robson River
Kiwetinok River
Blaeberry River
Bush River
Coal Creek
Lizard Creek
Emerald River
Gataga River
Moose Creek
McKale River
Morkill River
Valenciennes River
Wigwam River

Arctic Ocean drainage
Mackenzie River
Liard River
Fort Nelson River
Muskwa River
Sikanni Chief River
Trout River
Slave River
Athabasca River
Whirlpool River
Peace River
Smoky River
Jackpine River
Kakwa River
Muddywater River
Wapiti River
Ospika River

See also
List of rivers of the Rocky Mountains
List of rivers of the Pacific Ranges
List of rivers of the Kitimat Ranges
List of rivers of the Boundary Ranges
List of rivers of the Omineca Mountains

History of the Rocky Mountains
Canadian Rockies